The 1924 New South Wales Rugby Football League premiership was the seventeenth season of Sydney’s top-level rugby league club competition, Australia’s first. Nine teams from across the city contested during the season which culminated in Balmain’s victory over South Sydney in the premiership final. The 1924 season was the last in the NSWRFL for future Australian Rugby League Hall of Fame inductee, Harold Horder.

Teams
 Balmain, formed on 23 January 1908 at Balmain Town Hall
 Eastern Suburbs, formed on 24 January 1908 at Paddington Town Hall
 Glebe, formed on 9 January 1908
 Newtown, formed on 14 January 1908
 North Sydney, formed on 7 February 1908
 South Sydney, formed on 17 January 1908 at Redfern Town Hall
 St. George, formed on 8 November 1920 at Kogarah School of Arts
 Western Suburbs, formed on 4 February 1908
 University, formed in 1919 at Sydney University

Ladder
Because of the British Lions tour of Australia, and interstate matches, the 1924 season was shortened to a single round of eight matches. No club fixtures were played on the weekends of 31 May, 7 June, 21 June nor 28 June.

Premiership Final

Balmain and South Sydney finished equal at the top of the ladder, having dropped just one game each. The teams had earlier met in Round 5, with a 10–10 draw being the result at the Sydney Cricket Ground in front of a crowd of around 16,000.

The Final was played before a crowd of around 15,000 at the Sydney Cricket Ground on 29 July 1924 and refereed by former Rabbitoh premiership winner Webby Neill. Balmain led 3–0 at half-time and both sides failed to score in the second half. The Tigers thus claimed their sixth premiership within ten years. At the time it was the lowest-scoring Final since the start of the NSWRFL premiership and the first time a team had been held scoreless in a Final.

The Final was also the first rugby league match broadcast on radio with commentary by Balmain secretary Bob Savage.

Balmain 3 (Try: Latta)

defeated

South Sydney 0

References

External links
 Rugby League Tables - Notes AFL Tables
 Rugby League Tables - Season 1924 AFL Tables
 Premiership History and Statistics RL1908
 History - Introduction North Sydney Bears
 Andrews, Malcolm (2006) The ABC of Rugby League Austn Broadcasting Corpn, Sydney
Results: 1921-30 at rabbitohs.com.au

New South Wales Rugby League premiership
Nswrfl Season